Al-Ismul Azam  (Arabic: الاسم الأعظم) or Al-Ism al-A'zam, literally "the greatest name" (also known as "Ismullah-al-Akbar" (Arabic: اسم الله الأکبر), refers in Islam to the greatest name of Allah known only to the prophets.

Hadiths related to Ismul Azam 

Some names possess general meanings and can be applied instead of several other names, "... as far as will be ended to a/the name that there won't be another name(s) higher than that, and is called Esm-A'zam or Ismullah al-Akbar" (of course Ismullah al-Akbar has been applied to another meaning, too).

Ismul A'zam is believed to have a powerful effect in the act of blessing. According to Islamic hadiths, whoever calls Allah using this term, his or her dua will be granted.

See also 
Names of God in Islam
God in Islam
Hashem

References

External links 
 What is Ism Al-Azam?

Islamic terminology
Allah
God in Islam
Islamic prayer